Eshgaft-e Moneh castle is a historical castle located in Bastak County in Hormozgan Province, The longevity of this fortress dates back to the Sasanian Empire.

References 

Castles in Iran
Sasanian castles